Michelle Bernstein is an American chef from Miami, Florida. She is an expert in the Latin-style flavors of cooking. She is a James Beard Foundation Award recipient.

Early life
The daughter of an Argentine-Jewish mother and a father with Russian-Jewish heritage, Bernstein graduated from high school at 16 and moved to New York City to study dance at Alvin Ailey American Dance Theater. When an injury ended her career as a ballerina, she returned to Miami to study culinary arts at Johnson & Wales University.

Career
Bernstein won the James Beard Foundation Award for best chef in the South in 2008.

In 2001 she opened the restaurant Azul at the Mandarin Oriental. Esquire Magazine food critic John Mariani called it "the best new restaurant in America.

Bernstein was a co-host of the Food Network series Melting Pot and was once in a battle on Iron Chef America versus Bobby Flay, which she won. She has appeared as a guest judge on Top Chef. She also hosts a PBS weekly television series, Check, Please! South Florida. She has appeared on The Today Show, the Martha Stewart Show, and Despierta America.

In 2005, Bernstein and her husband, David Martinez, became business partners and left Azul to open Michy's in Miami. Gourmet named it one of the "Top 50 restaurants in the country," and Food & Wine named it "Best New Restaurant" in 2006.

In May 2006, Bernstein became a consulting chef for Delta Air Lines.

Bernstein's third restaurant arrived in 2008, called SRA. Martinez, a tapas restaurant in the Miami Design District. In 2009, SRA. Martinez was again named one of the "Best New Restaurants in America" by food critic John Mariani. In 2009, Bernstein said she would open a namesake restaurant.

Bernstein operates a Miami chapter of Common Threads.

In 2011, Bernstein opened Crumb on Parchment, a café in the Miami Design District.

In 2015, Bernstein and her husband opened Seagrape at the Thompson Hotel, Miami Beach; they also run all food and beverage operations in the Hotel.

In April 2015, she debuted her TV show "SoFlo Taste."

References

External links 

Michelle Bernstein at the Omphoy
Michelle Bernstein Profile on Aventura Business Monthly

American women chefs
American chefs
Johnson & Wales University alumni
Latin American cuisine
Living people
American people of Argentine-Jewish descent
American people of Russian-Jewish descent
James Beard Foundation Award winners
Jewish American chefs
Chefs from Florida
Year of birth missing (living people)
21st-century American Jews
21st-century American women